John Broome may refer to:

John Broome (politician) (1738–1810), New York politician
John L. Broome (1824–1898), USMC officer
Jack Broome (John Egerton Broome, 1901–1985), British Royal Navy officer
John Broome (writer) (1913–1999), American writer-contributor to DC comics
John Spoor Broome (1917–2009), American rancher, aviator and philanthropist
John Broome (philosopher) (born 1947), British philosopher and economist at the University of Oxford
Jack Broome (rugby league) (1930–2013), English rugby league footballer of the 1940s and 1950s for England, British Empire XIII, and Wigan